The Amory School District is a public school district based in Amory, Mississippi (USA). It serves most of Amory and some unincorporated areas.

Schools
Amory High School (Grades 9-12)
Amory Vocational Center
Amory Middle School (Grades 6-8)
East Amory Elementary School (Grades 3-5)
West Amory Elementary School (Grades PK-2)

Demographics

2006-07 school year
There were a total of 1,892 students enrolled in the Amory School District during the 2006–2007 school year. The gender makeup of the district was 50% female and 50% male. The racial makeup of the district was 35.41% African American, 63.74% White, 0.53% Hispanic, and 0.32% Asian. 45.4% of the district's students were eligible to receive free lunch.

Previous school years

Accountability statistics

See also
List of school districts in Mississippi

References

External links

Education in Monroe County, Mississippi
School districts in Mississippi